The Halswell River is a river in the Canterbury region of New Zealand.

The catchment within Christchurch City, mostly covered by the suburb of Halswell, is urban, and most of the Selwyn District catchment is rural. The two main tributaries are Knights Stream (which originates between Prebbleton and the suburb of Oaklands) and Te Tauawa a Maka / Nottingham Stream (which originates in Oaklands).

The Halswell River rises north-west of the Port Hills on the periphery of Christchurch and flows south into Lake Ellesmere / Te Waihora. Parts of the river originally had the Māori names of Huritini (meaning "many turns"), Te Tau Awa a Maka and Te Heru o Kahukura. The river was renamed for Edmund Halswell, who was a member of the management committee of the Canterbury Association and arrived in New Zealand in 1841.

See also
List of rivers of New Zealand

References

Rivers of Canterbury, New Zealand
Rivers of New Zealand